is a railway station operated by the Kominato Railway Company's Kominato Line, located in Ichihara, Chiba Prefecture, Japan. It is 23.8 kilometers from the western terminus of the Kominato Line at Goi Station.

History
Takataki Station was opened on March 7, 1925. Use of its island platform was discontinued on September 16, 1998. It has been unattended since 1967.

Lines
Kominato Railway Company
Kominato Line

Station layout
Takataki Station has a single side platform serving bidirectional traffic. The overgrown ruins of an opposing side platform remain. There is a small station building with a waiting room, but with no ticket gate.

Platforms

Adjacent stations

External links
  Kominato Railway Company home page

Railway stations in Japan opened in 1925
Railway stations in Chiba Prefecture